Mabrouka is a town in al-Hasakah Governorate, Syria. According to the Syria Central Bureau of Statistics (CBS), Mabrouka had a population of 6,325	 in the 2004 census.

References

Populated places in Ras al-Ayn District